To the Moon and Back can refer to:

Film and literature
 To the Moon and Back (book), a 2004 book by Jackie French and Bryan Sullivan
 To the Moon and Back, a 2016 documentary about the Dima Yakovlev Law
 To the Moon and Back, a story by Etgar Keret, translated for The New Yorker in October 2016
 To the Moon and Back (Karen Kingsbury book), a 2018 book by Karen Kingsbury

Songs
 "To the Moon and Back" (Fever Ray song), 2017
 "To the Moon and Back" (Savage Garden song), 1996

See also
 To the Moon (disambiguation)